The Beninese records in swimming are the fastest ever performances of swimmers from the Benin, which are recognised and ratified by the Federation Beninoise de Natation.

All records were set in finals unless noted otherwise.

Long Course (50 m)

Men

Women

Short Course (25 m)

Men

Women

Mixed relay

References

Benin
Records
Swimming